The Baltic Project was a plan promoted by the British Admiral Lord Fisher to procure a speedy victory against Germany during the First World War.

Submarines and extensive numbers of mines would keep the invasion force safe from the Imperial German Navy. More than 600 vessels would be required, including landing craft, minesweepers, destroyers, light cruisers, monitors and some heavy shallow draft support ships. The plan was never implemented.

See also
 Operation Catherine - a similar plan developed during the Second World War.

References 

Cancelled military operations of World War I
Royal Navy
Cancelled military operations involving the United Kingdom
Military strategy